Walter "Joe" Mays (March 20, 1914 – February 1986) was an American Negro league catcher in the 1930s.

A native of Sweet Home, Arkansas, Mays played for the St. Louis Stars in 1937. He died in Sweet Home in 1986 at age 71.

References

External links
 and Seamheads

1914 births
1986 deaths
St. Louis Stars (1937) players
Baseball catchers
Baseball players from Arkansas
People from Pulaski County, Arkansas
20th-century African-American sportspeople